Duponchelia caidalis is a moth in the family Crambidae. It was described by Oberthür in 1888. It is found in North Africa, where it has been recorded from Algeria and Egypt. It has also been recorded from the United Arab Emirates.

References

Moths described in 1888
Spilomelinae
Moths of Africa
Moths of Asia